OPX may refer to:

 OPX (meteorite class), a class of Martian meteorites
 Off-premises extension, an extension telephone at a location distant from its servicing private branch exchange
 Open Programming Extension, the DLL mechanism of the Open programming language of the Symbian operating system for mobile phones
 Orthopyroxene, a pyroxene, a type of rock-forming mineral
 Silver Xpress, a mail format used on FidoNet